Shing may refer to:

 Shing (Hainish Cycle), a fictional alien race in the Hainish Cycle of novels and short stories by Ursula K. Le Guin, especially in City of Illusions.
 Shing (surname), spelling of various Chinese surnames
 Shing, Tajikistan
 An onomatopoeia often used for bladed objects
 A Shina tribe of Chilas

See also

Sing (disambiguation)